Ezra Taylor may refer to:

 Ezra B. Taylor (1823–1912), U.S. Representative from Ohio
 Ezra Taylor (rugby union) (born 1983), New Zealand rugby union player
 Ezra Taylor (boxer) (born 1994), British boxer